Hangzhou or Hang Prefecture (589–1129) was a zhou (prefecture) in imperial China located in modern northern Zhejiang, China, around modern Hangzhou. The prefecture was called Yuhang Commandery from 607 to 621 and from 742 to 758. Hang Prefecture was the capital of the Wuyue kingdom (907–978), inside which it was known as Xi Prefecture (Western Prefecture), and during its last years of the kingdom, as Qiantang Prefecture.

Hang Prefecture sat at the head of the Hangzhou Bay, which opens to the East China Sea. It was also the southern terminus of the Grand Canal and the eastern terminus of the Qiantang River. During the Northern Song (960–1127) it was the capital of Liangzhe Circuit. In 1129 it became Lin'an Prefecture, which would become the capital of the Southern Song (1127–1279) in 1138.

Counties
For most of its history, Hang Prefecture administered the following 7–9 counties (縣), some of whose names changed frequently:

History

During Sui and the Sui–Tang transition (589–622)
In 587, the southern Chen dynasty (557–589) created Qiantang Commandery (錢唐郡), which administered four counties. When the northern Sui dynasty (581–618) conquered the Chen dynasty in 589, Qiantang Commandery was renamed to Hang Prefecture.

In 606, the City Walls were built.

In 607, Emperor Yang of Sui renamed hundreds of prefectures. Hang Prefecture was renamed to Yuhang Commandery.

In 609, the Grand Canal was completed.

During the transition from Sui to Tang, the warlord Shen Faxing first held Yuhang Commandery in the confusion following the assassination of Emperor Yang in 618. In 620, he was defeated by the warlord Li Zitong, who took over his territory.

During Tang and Wuyue (622–978)

The Tang dynasty (618–907) did not occupy the prefecture until December 611, when the Tang army under Li Fuwei destroyed Li Zitong's defense in Yuhang. The Tang renamed Yuhang Commandery to Hang Prefecture.

In 653, the woman rebel leader Chen Shuozhen attacked Hang Prefecture and took Yuqian.

In the late Tang dynasty, the rebel Huang Chao briefly occupied Hang Prefecture twice, first in 878 and later in 880. In the late 870s, local militias were formed to resist the rebel Wang Ying, and among the soldiers were Hang Prefecture natives Dong Chang and Qian Liu.

In 882, warlord Liu Hanhong, who was based in neighboring Yue Prefecture, wanted to take over Hang Prefecture from Dong Chang. He was soundly defeated by Dong Chang's force led by Qian Liu. In 886, Dong Chang promised Hang Prefecture to Qian Liu if he could destroy Liu Hanhong; Qian Liu did just that, capturing Liu Hanhong and taking over his territory. In 887, Qian Liu took over Hang Prefecture while Dong Chang went to Liu Hanhong's former base in Yue Prefecture. (Qian Liu later attacked and killed Dong Chang in 896.)

Qian Liu began a series of massive construction projects in Hang Prefecture in 890. These include the fortification of city walls and the construction of a dam to control the Qiantang River. After the Tang dynasty collapsed in 907, Qian Liu remained independent throughout the ensuing Five Dynasties period, even though like before he continued to pay tributes to the imperial courts in Kaifeng Prefecture (or Henan Prefecture during Later Tang).

During the Wuyue kingdom, many Buddhist pagodas were built in Hang Prefecture. These include Baochu Pagoda (963), Liuhe Pagoda (970), and Leifeng Pagoda (975).

During the Song dynasty (978–1129)
The inventor Bi Sheng was active in Hang Prefecture, as was Shen Kuo.

In December 1120, rebel Fang La took Hang Prefecture and held it until March 1121.

In March 1129, Zhao Gou fled the north and arrived with his followers in Hang Prefecture.

Prefects

Tang dynasty
Note: From 742 to 758 Hang Prefecture was known as Yuhang (Commandery).

Shuang Shiluo (雙士洛), 620s
Dugu Yishun (獨孤義順), 620s
Shi Lingqing (史令卿), 620s
Yang Xingju (楊行矩), 620s
Li Hongjie (李弘節), 628?–?
Yuan Shenwei (元神威), 630s?
Liu Chuxian (柳楚賢), 639?–640?
Pan Qiuren (潘求仁), 640–?
Xue Wanche (薛萬徹), 644?–645?
Cui Yuanjiang (崔元獎), 694–?
Li Ziyi (李自挹), 690s
Pei Quan (裴惓), 704–706/707?
Song Jing, 706/707–709?
Liu Youqiu, 714–715
Xue Zimian (薛自勉), ?
Wei Cou (韋湊), 722–?
Huangfu Zhong (皇甫忠), 722–723
Yuan Renjing (袁仁敬), 725–?
Zhang Shouxin (張守信), 746–748
Li Limu (李力牧), 750–?
Li Chuyou (李處祐), 750–?
Yan Sunzhi (嚴損之), 750–?
Liu Yan, 756–757
Cui Huan, 757–?
Hou Lingyi (侯令儀), 759–760
Zhang Boyi (張伯儀), 765–767
Liu Xian (劉暹), 767–?
Du Ji (杜濟), 773–777
Yuan Quanrou (元全柔), 780–781
Li Bi, 781–784
Yin Liang (殷亮), 785–?
Fang Rufu (房孺復), 788–?
Yu Shao (于邵), 792–?
Li Qi, 794–797
Pei Changdi (裴常棣)
Lu Ze (陸則)
Su Bian (蘇弁), 803–805
Han Gao (韓皋), 805–?
Zhang Gang (張綱), 805–?
Du Zhi (杜陟), 807–?
Yang Ping (楊憑), early 9th century
Lu Yuanfu (盧元輔), 813–815
Yan Xiufu (嚴休復), 817–?
Yuan Yu (元藇), 820–?
Bai Juyi, 822–824
Li Yougong (李幼公), 826–?
Cui Shan (崔鄯), 828–?
Lu Yi (路異), 832–?
Yao He, 835–838?
Li Zongmin, 838–?, 843–?
Li Zhongmin (李中敏), 840
Pei Yizhi (裴夷直), 840–841
Li Yuan (李遠), 858–?
Cui Juan (崔涓), 859–?
Cui Yanzeng (崔彦曾), 861–?
Lu Shenzhong (路審中), 881
Dong Chang, 881–886
Qian Liu, 887–907

Wuyue
Sun Zhi (孫陟)

Song dynasty

Fan Min (范旻), 978 
Zhai Shousu (翟守素), 979–982
Li Jining (李繼凝), 980s
Liu Zhixin (劉知信), 989–993
Wang Huaji (王化基), 993–995
Wei Yu (魏羽), 995–997
Zhang Quhua (張去華), 997–999
Zhang Yong (張詠), 999–1002
Song Taichu (宋太初), 1002
Wang Zhonghua (王仲華), 1002–1003
Xue Ying (薛暎), 1003–1007
Wang Ji (王濟), 1007–1010
Qi Lun (戚綸), 1010–1014
Xue Yan (薛顔), 1014–1016
Ma Liang (馬亮), 1016
Wang Qinruo, 1019–1020
Wang Sui (王隨), 1021–1022
Li Ji (李及), 1022–1023
Zhou Qi (周起), 1023–1026
Hu Ze (胡則), 1026–1028
Li Zi (李諮), 1028–1029
Zhu Xun (朱巽), 1029–1030
Chen Congyi (陳從易), 1030–1031
Zhang Guan (張觀), 1031–1033
Hu Ze (2nd appointment), 1033–1034
Zheng Xiang (鄭向), 1034–1036
Yu Xianqing (俞獻卿), 1036–1038
Liu Zhi (柳植), 1038–1039
Sima Chi (司馬池), 1039–1040
Zhang Ruogu (張若谷), 1040–1041
Zheng Jian (鄭戩), 1041–1042
Jiang Tang (蔣堂), 1042–1043
Yang Xie (楊偕), 1043–1045
Fang Xie (方偕), 1045–1047
Jiang Tang (2nd appointment), 1047–1049
Fan Zhongyan, 1049–1050
Zhang Fangping (張方平), 1050–1051
Lü Zhen (呂溱), 1051–1053
Ding Yongsun (丁永孫), 1053
Li Dui (李兌), 1053
Sun Gai (孫沔), 1054–1056
He Zhongli (何中立), 1056–1057
Mei Zhi (梅摰), 1057–1058
Tang Xun (唐詢), 1058–1060
Shi Changyan (施昌言), 1060–1062
Shen Gou (沈遘), 1062–1064
Wang Qi (王琪), 1064–1065
Cai Xiang, 1065–1066
Hu Su (胡宿), 1066–1067
Lü Zhen (2nd appointment), 1067
Zu Wuze (祖無擇), 1067–1069
Zheng Xie (鄭獬), 1069–1070
Zhao Bian (趙抃), 1070–1071
Shen Li (沈立), 1071–1072
Chen Xiang (陳襄), 1072–1074
Yang Hui (楊繪), 1074
Shen Qi (沈起), 1074–1076
Su Song, 1076–1077
Zhao Bian (2nd appointment), 1077–1079
Deng Runfu (鄧潤甫), 1079–1081
Zhang Shen (張詵), 1081–1085
Pu Zongmeng (蒲宗孟), 1085–1087
Yang Hui (2nd appointment), 1087–1088
Xiong Ben (熊本), 1088–1089
Su Shi, 1089–1091
Lin Xi (林希), 1091–1092
Wang Cun (王存), 1092–1094
Chen Xuan (陳軒), 1094–1096
Han Zongdao (韓宗道), 1096–1097
Li Cong (李琮), 1097–1098
Lin Xi (2nd appointment), 1098–1099
Feng Ji (豐稷), 1099–1100
Lü Huiqing (呂惠卿), 1100–1101
Gong Yuan (龔原), 1001
Chen Xuan (2nd appointment), 1101–1102
Zou Hao (鄒浩), 1102
Lü Huiqing (2nd appointment), 1102
Jiang Zhiqi (蔣之奇), 1102–1103
Yuwen Changling (宇文昌齡), 1103–1105
Zhong Chuan (鍾傳), 1105
Wang Ning (王寧), 1105
Zeng Xiaoguang (曾孝廣), 1105
Lü Huiqing (3rd appointment), 1106–1107
Zeng Xiaoyun (曾孝藴), 1107
Zhu Yan (朱彦), 1107–1108
Wang Huanzhi (王渙之), 1108–1109
Xi Zhen (席震), 1109
Cai Ni (蔡薿), 1109
Zhang Shangying (張商英), 1110
Liu Kui (劉逵), 1110
Zhang Ge (張閣), 1110–1111
Pang Yinsun (龐寅孫), 1111–1114
Dong Zhengfeng (董正封), 1114–1115
Li Yan (李偃), 1115–1116
Zhao Meng (趙㠓), 1116–1119
Zhao Ting (趙霆), 1119–1120
Zeng Xiaoyun (2nd appointment), 1121
Yu Yi (虞奕), 1121
Cai Ni (2nd appointment), 1121–1122
Weng Yanguo (翁彦國), 1122–1125
Tang Ke (唐恪), 1125–1126
Weng Yanguo (2nd appointment), 1126
Mao You (毛友), 1126
Ye Mengde (葉夢得), 1126–1127
Qian Boyan (錢伯言), 1127
Shiqi Fu (侍其傅), 1127–1128
Kang Yunzhi (康允之), 1128–1129

References

 
 
 
 
 

589 establishments
6th-century establishments in China
1129 disestablishments in Asia
12th-century disestablishments in China
Prefectures of the Sui dynasty
Prefectures of the Tang dynasty
Prefectures of Wuyue
Liangzhe West Circuit
History of Hangzhou
Former prefectures in Zhejiang